Karlik or Karlík is a given name and surname. It is a Czech masculine given name that is a diminutive form of Karel, which derives from Ceorl. The surname has a similar derivation. Notable people referred to by this name include the following:

Surname
Berta Karlik (1908 – 1996), Austrian physicist.
Bohuslav Karlík (1908 – 1996), Czechoslovak canoeist
Josef Karlík (1928 – 2009), Czech actor
Karol Karlík (born 1986), Slovak footballer

See also

Karli (name)
Karlin (surname)

References

Czech masculine given names